Alexandra Takounda Engolo (born 7 July 2000), known as Alexandra Takounda, is a Cameroonian footballer who plays as a forward for Djurgårdens and the Cameroon women's national team.

International career
Takounda represented Cameroon at the 2016 FIFA U-17 Women's World Cup and FIFA World Cup France 2019 where she played her first game in a 2:0 win over New Zealand.

References

2000 births
Living people
Cameroonian women's footballers
Cameroon women's international footballers
2019 FIFA Women's World Cup players
Women's association football forwards
21st-century Cameroonian women